Meadowbrook Mall is a regional shopping mall in Bridgeport, West Virginia. It was built in late 1982 by the Cafaro Company of Youngstown, Ohio. The original architecture and engineering was done by the Keeva J. Kekst company. The mall includes two department stores, JCPenney and Target, with a third anchor on the way as Boscov's is opening in 2023. Former anchors include Elder-Beerman, Ames, Murphy's Mart, Stone & Thomas, The Bon-Ton, Sears, and Montgomery Ward. Marshalls was added in 2008. ULTA Beauty opened here in 2015. In 2023, Boscov's announced that a store will open at the mall in the later part of the year, replacing the former Sears and nearby mall stores. This will be Boscov's 50th store and first location in West Virginia.

References

External links

Cafaro Company
Shopping malls in West Virginia
Buildings and structures in Harrison County, West Virginia
Tourist attractions in Harrison County, West Virginia
Shopping malls established in 1982
Bridgeport, West Virginia